KQRR (1130 AM, "Slavic Family Radio") is an American radio station licensed to serve the community of Mount Angel, Oregon. The station, originally licensed as KTRP, is owned by Bustos Media and the broadcast license is held by Bustos Media Holdings, LLC.

The station was assigned the call sign KQRR by the Federal Communications Commission (FCC) on December 13, 2011 and again on March 15, 2022.

In 2010, the station filed an application with the FCC to increase its day power to 50,000 watts. The application was dismissed.

On February 12, 2015, KQRR changed its call letters to KXET.

On March 15, 2022, KXET changed its call letters to KQRR.

Programming
Since December 2011, the station broadcasts a Russian-language religious radio format. As KPWX, the station previously aired a Regional Mexican music format branded as "1130 La Mexicana". In 2015, KXET began broadcasting community programs, produced by Slavic Family Media Center. It was branded as Slavic Family Radio.

See also
List of community radio stations in the United States

References

External links
Bustos Media official website

Slavic Family Media Center official website

QRR
Community radio stations in the United States
Radio stations established in 2010
Mt. Angel, Oregon
2010 establishments in Oregon
Russian-American culture in Oregon
Russian-language radio stations in the United States